Rashtreeya Vidyalaya College of Engineering (RVCE or RV College of Engineering, Rāshtrīya Vidyālaya Tāntrika Mahāvidyālaya) is an autonomous private technical co-educational college established in Bangalore, India in 1963. RVCE is recognized as a center of excellence under Technical Education Quality Improvement Program by Government of India.

RVCE has 13 departments in engineering, one school in architecture, and a Master of Computer Applications department. It is affiliated to the Visvesvaraya Technological University, Belgaum. The undergraduate courses are granted academic autonomy by the university. RVCE is accredited by the All India Council for Technical Education and all its departments are accredited by the National Board of Accreditation. The medium of instruction is English. The college is managed by the Rashtreeya Shikshana Samiti Trust. Rashtreeya Shikshana Samiti Trust with its administrative offices located in Jayanagar, Bangalore. The Trust is chaired by Dr. Panduranga Setty.

Academic profile

Admission
Students are admitted to undergraduate courses on basis of their performance in either Karnataka Common Entrance Test , or in the COMED-K test. Students are also admitted through a management quota, which does not place merit requirements. There is a lateral entry scheme in place, by which students holding diploma degrees can enter directly to the second year of study in engineering. Students, upon graduating, receive a Bachelor of Engineering degree. Students are admitted to postgraduate courses on basis of their GATE test scores, as well as on their Post Graduate Karnataka CET scores.

Achievements

RVCE has been recognised as a centre for excellence by the Union Government of India. 
In 2008, the college had the highest number of gold medal-winners among colleges affiliated to Visvesvaraya Technological University.
The department of Mechanical engineering of RVCE is the state's first degree programme in a private institution to be accredited by the National Board of Accreditation.

Rankings 

R.V. College of Engineering was ranked 89 among engineering colleges in India by the National Institutional Ranking Framework (NIRF) in 2022.

Departments and courses
Undergraduate
These departments offer four-year undergraduate courses in engineering. All of the undergraduate courses have been conferred autonomous status by the Visvesvaraya Technological University. The following programmes are offered Aerospace Engineering, Bio-technology, Chemical Engineering, Civil Engineering. Computer Science And Engineering, Artificial Intelligence and Machine learning, Electronics and Communication Engineering, Electrical And Electronics Engineering, Industrial Engineering and Management, Information Science Engineering, Electronics and Instrumentation Engineering, Mechanical Engineering, Electronics and Telecommunication Engineering. The School of Architecture offers a five-year Bachelor of Architecture (BArch) course which has also been conferred autonomous status by the Visvesvaraya Technological University.  The allied departments of the college are the departments of Physics, Chemistry, Mathematics, Humanities along with the placement & training department.

Postgraduate
Master of Computer Applications, Master of Technology offered by departments of Computer Science, Information Science, Electronics and Communication and Mechanical Engineering and Master of Architecture

Student projects
The Robotics team from the Instrumentation Technology Department won the "All India Robotics Challenge" at Shaastra 2007 The annual tech fest held at IIT Madras.

Student Space Technology Projects
Team Antariksh is a student satellite team established in 2015 that aims to build a nanosatellite and sounding rocket with a research based payload, guided and monitored by various scientists from the Indian Space Research Organisation Satellite Centre and faculty from RVCE. Started by three aerospace engineering students, as of 2020 the team has a strength of more than 100 students from all fields of engineering. Team Antariksh is a space technology student club whose goal is to understand, disseminate and apply the engineering skills for innovation in the field of aerospace technology. The hundred-member strong team belonging from various engineering backgrounds is involved in designing payload for ISRO's PS4 orbital platform, RVSAT-1 and experimental sounding rocket, ReSOLV-1.The flagship project of the team is RVSAT-1, which is a 2U nanosatellite that is scheduled to be launched in 2022, carrying a microbiological payload.

StudSat is a team of students of RVCE, along with students from some other colleges in the country and the Indian Space Research Organisation, teamed up to make the first pico satellite in India, called StudSat. The pico satellite was launched by the PSLV C-15 on 12 June 2010 from the Satish Dhawan Space Centre in Sriharikota. The camera on board has a low resolution of 90 metres. The panchromatic images are designed to provide terrain information during the satellite's short lifespan of six months to one year.

Society of Automotive Engineers Events
Ashwa Racing is a Formula racing car that won the "Best Car from South Asia" award in the Formula Society of Automotive Engineers event in Germany. The team was also the first Indian team to compete in the FSAE event in 2005 in Australia, which won the "Best Value for Money" award. The project team has been awarded the "Young Achiever 2007" award, an award instituted by the Rotary Midtown and the Brigade Group.
Team Vyoma is a student group that designs and manufactures UAVs (Unmanned Aerial Vehicles) to participate in Aerodesign competitions conducted by the Society of Automotive Engineers in Marietta, GA; and in Brazil. The team is the first Asian team to compete in the Aerodesign competitions.

Team Helios Racing is a group of students who designed an All Terrain Vehicle (ATV) that can travel on muddy swamps and climb up hills. The vehicle entered the "Mini BAJA Challenge" — an international challenge in Pretoria in October 2006, and became the national champion at Baja Student India in January 2015.

IEEE branch
The Institute of Electrical and Electronics Engineers (IEEE) operates a student branch in RVCE. It organises many events, some of them being a workshop LabVIEW (Laboratory Virtual Instrumentation Engineering Workbench), which is a platform and development environment for a visual programming language from National Instruments, various paper presentation competitions, and a seminar competition. IEEE PES RVCE chapter was Inaugurated in the year 2015 which organises events pertaining to Electrical Engineering.

Other projects
Garuda, a fuel-efficient, aerodynamic car, was designed by the Mechanical engineering students. The car reportedly gives a mileage of 180 kilometers per litre of fuel. Project Garuda members were the only team from India to participate in the Shell Eco Marathon held at Rockingham Raceway, Corby, UK. Project Garuda was awarded the 'Most Persevering Team' award, which is given to the best first-time participant every year.

Eight students of the RV College of Engineering developed a vehicle consuming water as a fuel. Together, they have developed a water-powered hybrid auto rickshaw. The team has developed an inexpensive and simple retrofit kit for auto rickshaws.

In June 2008, the students developed a prototype of a hybrid-electric vehicle that uses both electric energy and diesel mixed with bio-diesel. According to The Hindu, this is the first indigenous hybrid-electric prototype in the country and among very few prototypes to use bio-diesel. The project, codenamed 'Chimera', was conceived and the prototype developed by the final year students of four engineering disciplines – Mechanical, Electrical and Computer science and Industrial engineering.
From 2019, the college has also housed a center of excellence in Quantum Computing with the help of the student research team called CIRQuIT Quantum Research.

Notable alumni
 Anil Kumble, the former coach and captain of the Indian Cricket Team
Chetan Baboor, the former international table tennis champion and Arjuna award winner
Asha Bhat, Miss Supranational 2014 and Bollywood actress
Anu Bharadwaj, President  @ Atlassian
Vidyut Mohan, social entrepreneur and Earthshot Prize winner
Divya Gokulnath, the Co-founder and Director of BYJU'S The Learning App
Sharan Hegde, finance influencer as well as founder and CEO of The 1% Club

See also
BMS College of Engineering, Bengaluru.
B.M.S. Institute of Technology and Management.
PES University, Bengaluru.
National Institute of Technology Karnataka, Surathkal.

References

External links 
	 
 College website

Affiliates of Visvesvaraya Technological University
Engineering colleges in Bangalore
Educational institutions established in 1963
1963 establishments in Mysore State